Kees Fens (18 October 1929 in Amsterdam – 14 June 2008) was a Dutch writer, essayist and literary critic.

Fens received the P. C. Hooft Award in 1990. In 1999 he received the Laurens Janszoon Costerprijs.

Awards
1986: Frans Erens Award
1990: The P. C. Hooft Award

References

External links
"Kees Fens – 1929" – Digital library for Dutch literature (Retrieved 17 June 2008)
"INGANGEN OP FENS" – bibliografie van krantenartikelen van Kees Fens 1954 tot 2008

1929 births
2008 deaths
Dutch essayists
Writers from Amsterdam
Academic staff of Radboud University Nijmegen
P. C. Hooft Award winners
20th-century essayists